Bunium elegans is a species of flowering plant in the family Apiaceae found in Syria and Lebanon. A specimen is kept at the Muséum National d'Histoire Naturelle in Paris. The plant contains essential oils.

References

External links

Apioideae
Flora of Lebanon and Syria
Plants described in 1892